The 71st Infantry Division (71-ya Pekhotnaya Diviziya) was a reserve infantry formation of the Russian Imperial Army. It was mobilized twice, in 1904–1905 for the Russo-Japanese War and in 1914–1918 for World War I.

Organization
1st Brigade
281st Infantry Regiment
282nd Infantry Regiment
2nd Brigade
283rd Infantry Regiment
284th Infantry Regiment

Commanders
1904-1906: Eduard Ekk

References

Infantry divisions of the Russian Empire